Phyllopertha is a genus of shining leaf chafers in the beetle family Scarabaeidae. There are more than 20 described species in Phyllopertha, found primarily in the Palearctic.

Species
These 26 species belong to the genus Phyllopertha:

 Phyllopertha abullosa Linnaeus, 1988
 Phyllopertha bifasciata Linnaeus, 1966
 Phyllopertha brevipilosa Linnaeus, 1988
 Phyllopertha carinicollis Ohaus, 1905
 Phyllopertha chalcoides Ohaus, 1925
 Phyllopertha diversa Waterhouse, 1875
 Phyllopertha euchroma (Fairmaire, 1891)
 Phyllopertha glabripennis Medvedev, 1949
 Phyllopertha horticola (Linnaeus, 1758)
 Phyllopertha horticoloides Linnaeus, 1965
 Phyllopertha humeralis Fairmaire, 1887
 Phyllopertha intermixta (Arrow, 1913)
 Phyllopertha irregularis Waterhouse, 1875
 Phyllopertha latevittata Fairmaire, 1889
 Phyllopertha latitarsis Nonfried, 1891
 Phyllopertha obscuricolor Fairmaire, 1891
 Phyllopertha puncticollis Reitter, 1888
 Phyllopertha punctigera (Fairmaire, 1888)
 Phyllopertha sublimbata Fairmaire, 1900
 Phyllopertha suturata Fairmaire, 1887
 Phyllopertha suzukii Sawada, 1943
 Phyllopertha taiwana Li & Yang, 1997
 Phyllopertha virgulata Fairmaire, 1889
 Phyllopertha wassuensis Frey, 1971
 Phyllopertha yangi L.i.Kobayashi, 1995
 Phyllopertha zea Reitter, 1903

References

Further reading

 
 

Rutelinae